Livi or Līvi may refer to:
Līvi (band), a Latvian hard rock band
Līvi, Biksti Parish, a village in Latvia
Livi (healthcare service), a healthcare service in France and the United Kingdom

People with the surname
Alessandro Livi (born 1982), Italian footballer
Barbara Livi (born 1973), Italian actor of cinema, television, and theatre
Grazia Livi (1930–2015), Italian author and journalist
Ivo Livi, birth name of Yves Montand (1921-1991), Italian-French actor and singer
Jean-Louis Livi (born 1941), French film producer, nephew of Yves Montand
Massimo Livi Bacci (born 1936), Italian professor of demography
Piero Livi (1925–2015), Italian director and screenwriter
Ridolfo Livi (1856–1920), Italian anthropologist

See also 
 Livy (Titus Livius), a Roman historian